Africanus is Latin for "African". It may refer to:

People

Ancient Roman cognomen
 Africanus Fabius Maximus, the younger son of Quintus Fabius Maximus (consul 45 BC) and an unknown wife
 Cresconius Africanus, a Latin canon lawyer of uncertain date and place
 Julius Africanus, an orator in the time of Nero
 Titus Sextius Africanus, a censor of Gaul in the 1st century
 Lucius Apuleius Africanus Madaurensis (c. 124–c. 170 CE), a Latin-language prose writer
 Titus Sextius Cornelius Africanus, a consul in the 2nd century under Trajan
 Sextus Caecilius Africanus, a 2nd-century Roman legal scholar
 Scipio Africanus (disambiguation)
 Sextus Julius Africanus, a Christian traveller and historian of the 3rd century
 Junillus Africanus (fl. 541–549), a Quaestor of the Sacred Palace in the court of the Byzantine Emperor Justinian I
 Constantine the African i.e. Constantinus Africanus (11th century)

Given name or surname
 George Africanus (1763—1834), a West African slave, later credited as Nottingham's first black entrepreneur 
 Leo Africanus (1488–1554)
 Scipio Africanus (disambiguation)
 Africanus Horton (1835–1883), also known as James Beale, a writer and folklorist from Sierra Leone
 Albert Freeman Africanus King (1841–1914), American physician

Other uses
 Africanus (journal), a scientific journal about development problems with special reference to the Third World and southern Africa

See also 
 Australopithecus africanus, an extinct species of australopithecine
 Africana (disambiguation)
 Africanae (disambiguation)
 Africanis, a group of South African dogs not recognised as a breed
 Africanum